The 2022 Canterbury-Bankstown Bulldogs season was the 88th in the club's history. They competed in the National Rugby League's 2022 Telstra Premiership. Trent Barrett was head coach of the team for the first 10 rounds, before resigning following their 16-6 loss to the Newcastle Knights.

Fixtures

The club started 2022 with two pre-season trial matches against the Newcastle Knights and the Cronulla Sutherland Sharks in February before kicking off the regular season away to the North Queensland Cowboys in round one. On 13 June, they recorded their most impressive win in recent history beating the Parramatta Eels with Josh Addo-Carr scoring his first hat-trick of tries for the club.

Regular season

Ladder

2022 squad

Awards

Canterbury-Bankstown Bulldogs Awards Night
Held at Doltone House, Darling Island, Wednesday 7 September.

 Dr George Peponis Player of the Year: Jeremy Marshall-King 
 Coaches Award: Max King 
 Steve Mortimer Rookie of the Year: Jacob Kiraz
 Member's Player of the Year: Matt Burton
 Peter Warren Award (Community Service): Raymond Faitala-Mariner
 Terry Lamb Player of the Year (New South Wales Cup): Jackson Topine
 Hazem El Masri Player of the Year (Jersey Flegg): Bailey Hayward
 Les Johns Club Person of the Year: Steven Litvensky

References

Canterbury-Bankstown Bulldogs seasons
Canterbury-Bankstown Bulldogs